Enrique López López (born 18 May 1963) is a Spanish judge and politician serving as Cabinet Minister of Justice, Interior and Victims of the Community of Madrid since August 2019.

References

1963 births
Living people